Basic is a 2003 mystery-action thriller film directed by John McTiernan and starring John Travolta, Connie Nielsen, and Samuel L. Jackson. It is the second collaboration of Travolta and Jackson, following 1994's Pulp Fiction. The story follows a DEA agent solving the mystery of a bungled training exercise that leads to the deaths of multiple Army Ranger cadets and their instructor. Basic received negative reviews from critics regarding its overall plot and numerous twist endings. It was a box-office bomb, grossing only $42.8 million worldwide against a $50 million budget.

Plot
During a live fire exercise in the jungles of Panama, a team of Army Rangers trainees is led by the fearsome instructor Master Sergeant Nathan West. Sergeant Ray Dunbar emerges from the jungle carrying wounded Second Lieutenant Levi Kendall. The two men are pursued by Sergeant Mueller, whom Dunbar kills in self-defense. Although no other bodies are found, West's team is presumed dead.

Dunbar refuses to talk to Military Police investigator Captain Julia Osborne and insists on speaking to a fellow Ranger from outside the base, drawing an '8' on a piece of paper. The post commander Colonel Bill Styles calls in his friend: experienced interrogator, ex-Ranger and now DEA agent Tom Hardy, and assigns him to aid Osborne.

During interrogations of the survivors, they learn that West was infamous for being a ruthless, tough-as-nails sergeant. One of the trainees, Jay Pike, earned West's wrath for not following orders, and may have staged the murder.

Kendall, son of a Joint Chiefs of Staff general and a homosexual, claims West hated him and may have ordered a "training accident" on him. He claims West died when hit in the back with a phosphorus grenade. When Pike confessed to the crime, Dunbar wanted to turn him in; a firefight ensued and most of the trainees were killed.

Dunbar claims Kendall is lying and that Mueller and his fellow trainee Castro were illegally selling prescription drugs and West became aware of their drug dealing. Mueller used Pike's grenade to kill West and tried to frame Pike. A firefight broke out and several trainees were killed. Dunbar claims that Dr. Peter Vilmer supplied the drugs and falsified drug tests so that soldiers came out clean. After confessing to the crime, Vilmer is placed under arrest.

Styles orders Osborne and Hardy not to talk to Kendall again. They disobey and interrogate Kendall once more, but he suddenly begins vomiting blood. Before dying, he draws an '8' with his own blood on Osborne's hand. Hardy explains a rumor about a group of ex-Rangers in Panama calling themselves "Section 8". They apparently trained under West, turned rogue and became drug dealers.

Styles is furious; he relieves Osborne of duty and tells Hardy to leave. He considers the investigation closed and a CID transport from Washington arrives to take Vilmer and Dunbar away.

Vilmer accidentally reveals that 'Dunbar' is actually Pike, and Hardy removes Pike from the plane just before takeoff. Pike explains that West learned about the actual operation going on at the base: cocaine smuggling. He confronted the Rangers and threatened to turn them in to authorities. After a brief firefight, West and the other trainees were killed. Pike took Dunbar's dog tags and carried Kendall to the extraction point. He then gives Hardy, Osborne, and Styles the number of a crate where Vilmer had stowed cocaine.

Hardy confronts Styles, determining he was behind the drug-dealing operation the whole time. When West reported the operation to Styles, Styles ordered Mueller and Kendall to kill him in the jungle, then poisoned Kendall to silence him. Styles tries to bribe Hardy before attempting to shoot him; Styles is instead shot and killed by Osborne, who was eavesdropping on their talk.

As the investigation concludes, Osborne suspects that Hardy is somehow involved in the incident; this is confirmed when she watches Pike sneak into Hardy's car. She follows them into Panama City, where they enter a bar with a big eight-ball hanging above. After going inside, she is greeted by West and the missing members of the team Castro, Dunbar, and Nuñez, who Hardy reveals as his 'colleagues'.

They explain that Section 8 is a covert black-ops anti-drug unit led by Colonel Tom Hardy; the "insane mercenary" story is a cover to spook the cartels. The agents infiltrated the base undercover to investigate cocaine trafficking and discovered Mueller, Kendall and Vilmer were responsible. West, not realizing Styles was also involved, informed him of the drug dealing. The training mission became a covert Section 8 operation to circumvent Mueller and Kendall and fake West's death in order to extract West from leadership and transfer him to Section 8. Hardy was called in to confirm Styles' and Vilmer's involvement.

Impressed by her work, Hardy offers Osborne a job in the unit.

Cast
John Travolta as DEA Agent (later Colonel) Tom Hardy
Connie Nielsen as Captain Julia Osborne
Samuel L. Jackson as Master Sergeant Nathan West
Tim Daly as Colonel Bill Styles
Giovanni Ribisi as Second Lieutenant Levi Kendall
Brian Van Holt as Sergeant Ray Dunbar
Taye Diggs as Jay Pike
Dash Mihok as Sergeant Mueller
Cristián de la Fuente as Castro
Roselyn Sánchez as Nuñez
Harry Connick Jr. as Dr. Peter Vilmer

Production
In May 2000, it was announced Phoenix Pictures had acquired James Vanderbilt's thriller script Basic for $400,000 against $700,000 following a heated bidding war with several other studios. In August of that year, it was announced Lee Tamahori had entered negotiations to direct the film. In October, Benicio del Toro and Catherine Keener were announced to be in final negotiations to play the leads. In July 2001, it was announced John McTiernan would be stepping in as director after Tamahori dropped out during realignment with Intermedia. 

After development of the project stumbled, the project was realigned when Intermedia came on board as a financier with del Tor and Keener having since dropped out. In September of that year, it was announced John Travolta and Samuel L. Jackson would star in the film.

Reception

Box office
Basic earned $11.5 million in its opening weekend, ranking behind Head of State, Bringing Down the House, and The Core. It grossed $26,793,311 in the US by the end of its theatrical run.

Critical response
Basic garnered negative reviews from critics. The website's critical consensus reads: "Basic gets so needlessly convoluted in its plot twists that the viewer eventually loses interest." On Metacritic, the film has a score of 34 out of 100, based on 33 critics, indicating "generally unfavorable reviews". Audiences polled by CinemaScore gave the film an average grade of "B" on an A+ to F scale.

Roger Ebert wrote that it was "not a film that could be understood", and that "It is all smoke and no mirrors. If I were to see it again and again, I might be able to extract an underlying logic from it, but the problem is, when a movie's not worth seeing twice, it had better get the job done the first time through."

Marjorie Baumgarten of The Austin Chronicle commended Travolta and Jackson for delivering "a couple of fun, over-the-top moments" and Ribisi for scenery chewing "like nobody's business", but felt the film comes across as a "preposterous" mess, saying, "It begins in a muddle and ends in confusion. In between, Basic takes more silly twists than any that might be on display at a Chubby Checker look-alike contest."

Chuck Randolph of Slant Magazine was mixed on the overall cast's performances, commended McTiernan's "efficient technical direction", and criticized the multiple twist endings for putting the film's "straightforward" action thriller story into "kindergarten territory", saying that "Basic is actually boiled down to the most uncomplicated of summations: it makes absolutely no sense."

Leonard Maltin's Movie Guide gave it two stars out of four and wrote that the film "keeps adding layers of confusion so that it becomes less interesting as it goes along! The final "twist" seems to negate the entire story, like a bad shaggy-dog joke."

References

External links
 Official site
 
 

2003 films
2003 action thriller films
2000s American films
2000s English-language films
2000s German films
American action thriller films
American detective films
Columbia Pictures films
English-language German films
Films about United States Army Rangers
Films directed by John McTiernan
Films produced by James Vanderbilt
Films scored by Klaus Badelt
Films set in Panama
Films shot in Jacksonville, Florida
Films shot in Panama
Films with screenplays by James Vanderbilt
German action thriller films
Panama Canal
Phoenix Pictures films